Yahei Miura (三浦弥平, 2 April 1891 – 1971) was a Japanese long-distance runner. He competed in the marathon at the 1920 and 1924 Summer Olympics.

Biography
Yahei Miura was born in the village of Shirane, in present-day Yanagawa, now a part of Date City, Fukushima. As a child, he was often sick to the point of having to leave school for months at a time. He used this time to exercise and strengthen his body, setting the foundation for his life as an athlete. At the age of twenty-four Miura entered Waseda University, where he was a member of the racing club. Five years later, he placed 24th in the 1920 Olympic marathon in Antwerp, Belgium.

Miura spent the following years studying in Belgium. He then participated in the 1924 Paris Olympics before returning to Shirane Village in 1928. He went on to be an active member of the community. He founded the "Momo Marathon" held in September in Date City's former town of Hobara. Additionally, the "Miura Yahei Road Race" is held in his honor in Yanagawa in October.

References

External links
 
 Article (with photos) about Yahei Miura in Date City, Fukushima's monthly city magazine (Japanese)

1891 births
1971 deaths
Sportspeople from Fukushima Prefecture
Japanese male long-distance runners
Japanese male marathon runners
Olympic male marathon runners
Olympic athletes of Japan
Athletes (track and field) at the 1920 Summer Olympics
Athletes (track and field) at the 1924 Summer Olympics
Japan Championships in Athletics winners